The derivatives of scalars, vectors, and second-order tensors with respect to second-order tensors are of considerable use in continuum mechanics. These derivatives are used in the theories of nonlinear elasticity and plasticity, particularly in the design of algorithms for numerical simulations.

The directional derivative provides a systematic way of finding these derivatives.

Derivatives with respect to vectors and second-order tensors 
The definitions of directional derivatives for various situations are given below. It is assumed that the functions are sufficiently smooth that derivatives can be taken.

Derivatives of scalar valued functions of vectors
Let f(v) be a real valued function of the vector v. Then the derivative of f(v) with respect to v (or at v) is the vector defined through its dot product with any vector u being

for all vectors u. The above dot product yields a scalar, and if u is a unit vector gives the directional derivative of f at v, in the u direction.

Properties:
 If  then 
 If  then 
 If  then

Derivatives of vector valued functions of vectors
Let f(v) be a vector valued function of the vector v. Then the derivative of f(v) with respect to v (or at v) is the  second order tensor defined through its dot product with any vector u being

for all vectors u. The above dot product yields a vector, and if u is a unit vector gives the direction derivative of f at v, in the directional u.

Properties:
 If  then 
 If  then 
 If  then

Derivatives of scalar valued functions of second-order tensors
Let  be a real valued function of the second order tensor .

for all second order tensors .

Properties:
 If  then 
 If  then 
 If  then

Derivatives of tensor valued functions of second-order tensors
Let  be a second order tensor valued function of the second order tensor .

for all second order tensors .

Properties:
 If  then 
 If  then 
 If  then 
 If  then

Gradient of a tensor field 
The gradient, of a tensor field  in the direction of an arbitrary constant vector c is defined as:

The gradient of a tensor field of order n is a tensor field of order n+1.

Cartesian coordinates 

Since the basis vectors do not vary in a Cartesian coordinate system we have the following relations for the gradients of a scalar field , a vector field v, and a second-order tensor field .

Curvilinear coordinates 

From this definition we have the following relations for the gradients of a scalar field , a vector field v, and a second-order tensor field .

where the Christoffel symbol  is defined using

Cylindrical polar coordinates 
In cylindrical coordinates, the gradient is given by

Divergence of a tensor field 
The divergence of a tensor field  is defined using the recursive relation

where c is an arbitrary constant vector and v is a vector field. If  is a tensor field of order n > 1 then the divergence of the field is a tensor of order n− 1.

Cartesian coordinates 

In a Cartesian coordinate system we have the following relations for a vector field v and a second-order tensor field .

where tensor index notation for partial derivatives is used in the rightmost expressions. Note that

For a symmetric second-order tensor, the divergence is also often written as

The above expression is sometimes used as the definition of
 in Cartesian component form (often also written as
).  Note that such a definition is not consistent with the rest of this article (see the section on curvilinear co-ordinates).

This is demonstrated by an example. In a Cartesian coordinate system the second order tensor (matrix)  is the gradient of a vector function .

The last equation is equivalent to the alternative definition / interpretation

Curvilinear coordinates 

In curvilinear coordinates, the divergences of a vector field v and a second-order tensor field  are

More generally,

Cylindrical polar coordinates 
In cylindrical polar coordinates

Curl of a tensor field 
The curl of an order-n > 1 tensor field  is also defined using the recursive relation

where c is an arbitrary constant vector and v is a vector field.

Curl of a first-order tensor (vector) field 
Consider a vector field v and an arbitrary constant vector c. In index notation, the cross product is given by

where  is the permutation symbol, otherwise known as the Levi-Civita symbol. Then,

Therefore,

Curl of a second-order tensor field 
For a second-order tensor 

Hence, using the definition of the curl of a first-order tensor field,

Therefore, we have

Identities involving the curl of a tensor field 
The most commonly used identity involving the curl of a tensor field, is

This identity holds for tensor fields of all orders. For the important case of a second-order tensor, this identity implies that

Derivative of the determinant of a second-order tensor
The derivative of the determinant of a second order tensor  is given by

In an orthonormal basis, the components of  can be written as a matrix A. In that case, the right hand side corresponds the cofactors of the matrix.

Derivatives of the invariants of a second-order tensor
The principal invariants of a second order tensor are

Derivative of the second-order identity tensor
Let  be the second order identity tensor. Then the derivative of this tensor with respect to a second order tensor  is given by

Derivative of a second-order tensor with respect to itself
Let  be a second order tensor. Then

Therefore,

Here  is the fourth order identity tensor. In index notation with respect to an orthonormal basis

This result implies that

where

Therefore, if the tensor  is symmetric, then the derivative is also symmetric and we get

where the symmetric fourth order identity tensor is

Derivative of the inverse of a second-order tensor
Let  and  be two second order tensors, then

In index notation with respect to an orthonormal basis

We also have

In index notation

If the tensor  is symmetric then

Integration by parts 

Another important operation related to tensor derivatives in continuum mechanics is integration by parts. The formula for integration by parts can be written as

When  is equal to the identity tensor, we get the divergence theorem

We can express the formula for integration by parts in Cartesian index notation as

In index notation,

See also 
 Covariant derivative
 Ricci calculus

References 

Solid mechanics
Mechanics